Spanish Point may refer to:

Spanish Point (Antarctica), on Bulgarian Beach on Hurd Peninsula, Antarctica 
Spanish Point (Barbuda), one of the two southernmost points on the Caribbean island of Barbuda
Spanish Point, Bermuda, prominent headland in Bermuda
Spanish Point, County Clare, village in County Clare, Ireland
Historic Spanish Point, museum and environmental complex located in Osprey, Florida, United States